Maksym Serhiyovych Sasovskyi (born 23 August 2001) is a Ukrainian professional footballer who plays as a centre-back for Ukrainian club Lviv.

Previously he played for Volyn Lutsk.

References

External links
 Profile on Volyn Lutsk official website
 

2001 births
Living people
Footballers from Lutsk
Ukrainian footballers
Association football defenders
FC Volyn Lutsk players
FC Lviv players
Ukrainian First League players
Ukrainian Second League players
Sportspeople from Volyn Oblast